Emil Solnørdal (born 2 October 1999) is a Norwegian football player who plays as midfielder for IL Hødd in 2020.

Solnørdal started his youth career with Aalesund in 2013, and his senior career their professional club in 2017. After two season, he moved to Brattvåg in 2019.

References

1999 births
Living people
Sportspeople from Ålesund
Norwegian footballers
Aalesunds FK players
Brattvåg IL players
IL Hødd players
Eliteserien players
Association football midfielders
Norway youth international footballers